Exochi is a village and a community of the Katerini municipality. Before the 2011 local government reform it was part of the municipality of Elafina, of which it was a municipal district. The 2011 census recorded 446 residents in the village and 583 in the community.

Administrative division
The village of Toxo (137 residents as of 2011) is part of the community of Exochi.

See also
Elafina
List of settlements in the Pieria regional unit

References

Populated places in Pieria (regional unit)